Michael Rock is the name of:

Michael Rock (DJ), American DJ at radio station WFHN
Michael Rock (graphic designer), American graphic designer
Michael Rock (swimmer) (born 1987), British swimmer